James "Buster" Davis (born October 20, 1983) is a former American football linebacker. He was drafted by the Arizona Cardinals in the third round of the 2007 NFL Draft. He played college football at Florida State. Davis has also been a member of the Detroit Lions, Indianapolis Colts and Houston Texans.

Early years
Buster Davis played for Mainland High School in Daytona Beach. Davis played in the 2002 U.S. Army All-American Bowl alongside fellow Florida State Seminoles Kamerion Wimbley and Lorenzo Booker.

Professional career

Arizona Cardinals
Davis was drafted by the Arizona Cardinals in the third round in the 2007 NFL Draft out of Florida State University. Davis signed a three-year, $1.7 million contract with a $610,000 signing bonus with the Cardinals, but was later released on September 1, 2007.

Detroit Lions
On September 4, 2007, he joined the practice squad of the Detroit Lions. He was promoted to the active roster on December 19. Davis was waived by the Lions during final cuts on August 30, 2008.

Indianapolis Colts
A day after being let go by the Lions, Davis was claimed off waivers by the Indianapolis Colts on August 31, 2008. An exclusive-rights free agent in the 2009 offseason, Davis was re-signed by the Colts on March 17. However, he was waived by the team two weeks later on March 31.

Houston Texans
Davis signed a one-year deal with the Houston Texans on April 3, 2009. He was waived on September 5. He was re-signed to the practice squad and released on September 15. On October 8 he was re-signed to the practice squad, he was released on October 13.

References

External links
Detroit Lions bio
Houston Texans bio
Indianapolis Colts bio
Florida State Seminoles bio
Just Sports Stats

1983 births
Living people
Sportspeople from Daytona Beach, Florida
Players of American football from Florida
American football linebackers
Florida State Seminoles football players
Arizona Cardinals players
Detroit Lions players
Indianapolis Colts players
Houston Texans players
Hartford Colonials players
Las Vegas Locomotives players
Jacksonville Sharks players
Mainland High School alumni